Mount McKenny is a mountain rising to  at the south end of the Daniels Range,  southeast of Mount Toogood, in the Usarp Mountains of Antarctica. It was mapped by the United States Geological Survey from surveys and U.S. Navy air photos, 1960–63, and was named by the Advisory Committee on Antarctic Names for Clarence D. McKenny, a United States Antarctic Research Program meteorologist who wintered at South Pole Station in 1959 and 1961, and at Eights Station in 1963.

References

Mountains of Victoria Land
Pennell Coast